Mount Arthur (Tuao Wharepapa in Māori) is in the Wharepapa / Arthur Range in the north western area of the South Island of New Zealand.

Geology
Mt Arthur is made of hard, crystalline marble, transformed (hardened) from limestone, originally laid down under the sea some 450 million years ago in the Ordovician. The "Arthur Marble" is part of the Takaka Terrane which was part of Gondwana and is similar to rocks in modern-day south-east Australia.  Below ground are some of the deepest shafts and most intricate cave systems in the country, and exploration of these is far from finished. Mount Arthur is home to the Ellis Basin cave system, the deepest cave in the Southern Hemisphere, and Nettlebed Cave which was thought to be the deepest cave system the Southern Hemisphere prior to discovery of the Ellis Basin cave system in 2010.

During the ice ages small glaciers carved smooth basins called 'cirques' high on Mt Arthur, polishing and scraping the tough marble. The floors of the cirques are studded with sinkholes where surface water is taken underground into extensive cave systems.

See also
Geology of New Zealand
List of mountains of New Zealand by height

References

Kahurangi National Park
Arthur